Josip Mrzljak (born 19 January 1944, in Vukovar) was the bishop of the Roman Catholic Diocese of Varaždin from 2007 to 2019.

His father Vladimir went missing in 1945, and is thought to have been killed by the Yugoslav Partisans. Mrzljak was ordained a priest in 1969 by Cardinal Franjo Kuharić.

Pope John Paul II appointed him auxiliary bishop of Zagreb on 29 December 1998 and he was consecrated a bishop on 6 February 1999.

Pope Benedict XVI named him Bishop of Varaždin on 20 March 2007.

Pope Francis accepted his resignation on 1 August 2019.

References

External links

1944 births
Living people
People from Vukovar
Roman Catholic bishops in Croatia
Bishops of Varaždin
Bishops appointed by Pope John Paul II